Ronald Charles Brewer (born September 16, 1955) is a retired American professional basketball player.  A 6'4" (1.93 m) guard from the University of Arkansas, he was selected by the Portland Trail Blazers in the first round of the 1978 NBA draft.

Prep years
Brewer played basketball at Fort Smith Northside High School, leading the Grizzlies to the 1974 Overall Championship and a 30–0 record .

Collegiate career
Following high school, Brewer attended Westark Community College (now the University of Arkansas at Fort Smith).  Brewer then signed to play for coach Eddie Sutton at the University of Arkansas.  One of the famed "Triplets" along with Sidney Moncrief and Marvin Delph, Brewer was named All-American in 1978.  He averaged 18.0 points per game while helping the Arkansas Razorbacks reach the Final Four in the 1978 NCAA Men's Division I Basketball Tournament, and was also named to the All-Tournament Team.

NBA career
Ron Brewer was selected by the Trail Blazers with 7th pick in the 1978 NBA draft, and was named to the 1978–79 NBA All-Rookie Team,  Brewer was drafted directly after Larry Bird and ahead of notable NBA players such as Reggie Theus and Maurice Cheeks. On October 14, 1979 Brewer became the first Trail Blazer to hit a three point shot in a regular season game .

Brewer went on to spend eight seasons in the league with six teams—the Trail Blazers, San Antonio Spurs, Cleveland Cavaliers, Golden State Warriors, New Jersey Nets, and Chicago Bulls—and finished his career in 1986 with 5,971 total points (11.9 ppg).

Personal life
His son, Ronnie Brewer, also played college basketball at the University of Arkansas, and was selected by the Utah Jazz in the first round of the 2006 NBA draft. They became the first father-son combination in Chicago Bulls history when Ronnie joined that team in 2010.
He is currently the head coach at  City University in Memphis, Tennessee.

External links
NBA career stats @ basketball-reference.com
 https://web.archive.org/web/20091027115945/http://geocities.com/minorshogs/greats/brewer.html
 http://www.nba.com/historical/playerfile/index.html?player=ron_brewer
 http://www.thedraftreview.com/index.php?option=com_content&view=article&id=1476

1955 births
Living people
African-American basketball players
All-American college men's basketball players
American men's basketball players
Arkansas–Fort Smith Lions basketball players
Arkansas Razorbacks men's basketball players
Basketball players from Arkansas
Chicago Bulls players
Cleveland Cavaliers players
Golden State Warriors players
Junior college men's basketball players in the United States
New Jersey Nets players
Point guards
Portland Trail Blazers draft picks
Portland Trail Blazers players
San Antonio Spurs players
Shooting guards
Sportspeople from Fort Smith, Arkansas
21st-century African-American people
20th-century African-American sportspeople